Nicolas Aithadi (born April 23, 1972, in Saint-Denis, France) is a French visual effects supervisor working in London, Vancouver and Los Angeles.

Career
Aithadi began his career from low-budget films to blockbusters such as Troy, Charlie and the Chocolate Factory and four Harry Potter films. For Harry Potter and the Deathly Hallows – Part 1, he was nominated for a BAFTA Award and an Oscar.

He was nominated at the 87th Academy Awards for his work on the film Guardians of the Galaxy as the Marvel Visual Effects Supervisor. This was in the category of Best Visual Effects. His nomination was shared with Stephane Ceretti, Jonathan Fawkner and Paul Corbould. With them he was also nominated at the 68th British Academy Film Awards

Awards and nominations
 2010: BAFTA Award: Best Visual Effects - Harry Potter and the Half-Blood Prince - Nominated  
 2011: BAFTA Award: Best Visual Effects - Harry Potter and the Deathly Hallows – Part 1 - Nominated 
 2010: Academy Awards: Best Visual Effects - Harry Potter and the Deathly Hallows – Part 1 - Nominated  
 2014: BAFTA Award: Best Visual Effects - Guardians of the Galaxy - Nominated 
 2014: Academy Awards: Best Visual Effects -  Guardians of the Galaxy- Nominated

References

External links
 
 www.instagram.com/casqu8

Living people
1972 births
Special effects people